Kim Brownfield is a former Paralympic powerlifter who has won five Paralympic medals. He won his first medal in 1988 Summer Paralympics aged 23

References

Sportspeople from Oklahoma
Medalists at the 1992 Summer Paralympics
Medalists at the 1996 Summer Paralympics
Medalists at the 2000 Summer Paralympics
Powerlifters at the 1992 Summer Paralympics
Powerlifters at the 1996 Summer Paralympics
Powerlifters at the 2000 Summer Paralympics
Powerlifters at the 2004 Summer Paralympics
Year of birth missing (living people)
Living people
Paralympic powerlifters of the United States
Paralympic medalists in powerlifting
Paralympic gold medalists for the United States
Paralympic silver medalists for the United States